The California Innocence Project is a non-profit based at California Western School of Law in San Diego, California, United States, which provides pro bono legal services to individuals who maintain their factual innocence of crime(s) for which they have been convicted. It is an independent chapter of the Innocence Project. Its mission is to exonerate wrongly convicted inmates through the use of DNA and other evidences.

It has succeeded in freeing more than 34 wrongfully incarcerated individuals since its inception in 1999, who have spent a combination of more than 570 years wrongfully in prison.
As a law school clinical program, CIP provides educational experience to students enrolled in its clinic. Working alongside CIP staff attorneys, clinic students investigate and litigate cases where there is strong evidence of innocence. CIP attorneys and students pursue cases by securing expert witnesses and advocating for their clients during evidentiary hearings and trials.
Each year, CIP reviews more than 2,000 claims of innocence from inmates convicted in Southern California.

History 
The California Innocence Project was founded in 1999 at California Western School of Law in San Diego, California by Director Justin Brooks and Law Professor Jan Stiglitz. CIP was the fourth innocence project to form in the United States as part of the national innocence movement or Innocence Network.

Notable exonerations 

The project has secured the release of the following innocent people who otherwise might otherwise have remained incarcerated for the rest of their lives:

Brian Banks 

Brian Banks was exonerated in 2012 after his accuser recanted her testimony that Banks raped and kidnapped her. Faced with a possible 41 years to life sentence, he accepted a plea deal that included five years in prison, five years of probation, and registering as a sex offender. The California Innocence Project took on the case after Banks came to the project with compelling evidence of innocence. After several months of investigation, the Los Angeles District Attorney agreed to dismiss the case against Banks.
On August 20, 2012, Banks became an advocate for the innocence movement by helping the California Innocence Project deliver petition signatures to the California Attorney General in the Daniel Larsen case. On August 29, 2012, Banks continued his advocacy by helping deliver petition signatures to the Nicaraguan embassy in the Jason Puracal case. Since his exoneration, Banks tried out for numerous NFL teams before signing with the Atlanta Falcons on April 3, 2013.

Timothy Atkins 
Timothy Atkins was exonerated after 23 years in prison when witness Denise Powell recanted her testimony that Atkins committed a murder. Based on Powell's recantation, attorney Justin Brooks of CIP brought a state habeas corpus action on Atkins's behalf. On February 8, 2007, Judge Michael A. Tynan granted the writ of habeas corpus, saying that the trial testimony of witness Maria Gonzalez had been "highly questionable, if not totally unreliable" and that no reasonable judge or jury could have found Atkins guilty without Powell's now recanted testimony. On April 6, 2007, the Los Angeles County District Attorney's Office dropped the charges. Atkins and the California Innocence Project have since been fighting to get compensation from California for his wrongful conviction.

John Stoll 
John Stoll was sentenced to 40 years in prison, and later exonerated in 2006 after several child victims recanted their testimony that Stoll had molested them. CIP, in conjunction with the Northern California Innocence Project at Santa Clara University School of Law, uncovered new evidence that disputed the boys' testimony and were granted an evidentiary hearing. Four witnesses who had testified against Stoll as children admitted that the sexual abuse stories they told as children were lies and that law enforcement officials, social workers, and prosecutors had coerced them into making false allegations against Stoll. At the conclusion of the hearing, Stoll's conviction was overturned. He had spent 20 years in prison for his alleged crime. Stoll's was one of many problematic Kern County child abuse cases, of which 34 were overturned on appeal.

Daniel Larsen 

Daniel Larsen was exonerated in 2010 yet remained incarcerated until March 19, 2013 because the California Attorney General, Kamala Harris, continued to appeal. Based largely on eyewitness identification by two police officers, Larsen was convicted in 1999 of being in possession of a concealed knife under California's Three Strikes Law. Because he had prior felony convictions, Larsen was sentenced to 28 years to life in prison. The California Innocence Project, which began representing Larsen in 2002, found witnesses, including a former chief of police and the actual owner of the knife, who testified seeing a different man holding the knife.
In 2010, a judge ordered Larsen's release, finding that he was "actually innocent" of the crime and that Larsen's constitutional rights were violated, because his attorney was incompetent. Despite the ruling, Larsen remained in prison for two more years while the state attorney general challenged the judge's ruling because Larsen had missed the appeal deadline. In 2013 the 9th U.S. Circuit Court of Appeals upheld the lower court ruling and freed Larsen after 14 years in prison.

Kenneth Marsh 
Kenneth Marsh was exonerated in 2004 after the San Diego District Attorney's office agreed to Marsh's habeas petition. Marsh was originally convicted in the death of his 33-month-old baby. After uncovering evidence from medical experts that proved Marsh's innocence, CIP, along with attorney Tracy Emblem, filed a petition for writ of habeas corpus on Marsh's behalf in 2002 seeking a new trial. At the defense's request, the San Diego District Attorney's Office hired an outside medical expert to review all of the evidence. After the review, San Diego District Attorney Bonnie Dumanis asked the court to grant Marsh's habeas corpus petition and release him until a new trial could be scheduled. Shortly afterward, the D.A.'s office dismissed the charges and Marsh was released after 21 years of incarceration.

Adam Riojas 
Adam Riojas was exonerated in 2004 after spending 13 years in prison for the second-degree murder of Jose Rodarte. Riojas' father later admitted to being involved in the crime. The California Innocence Project appeared on Riojas' behalf at his parole hearing. After listening to testimony related to Riojas Sr.'s confession, a deputy district attorney stated on the record that he was "seriously concerned that this inmate may have been wrongfully convicted." Riojas was released after Governor Arnold Schwarzenegger chose not to block the unanimous decision of the parole board, which had granted Riojas parole for the second consecutive year.

Jason Kindle 
Jason Kindle was exonerated in 2003 after spending four years in prison for armed robbery of an Office Depot store, where Kindle was a contracted janitor. He was sentenced under California's "Three-strikes" law to 70 years to life. The California Innocence Project, working with a local Los Angeles attorney, reexamined the evidence presented at trial and discovered surveillance video of the crime showing the perpetrator to stand 6-foot 6 inches tall; Kindle is only 6 feet tall. The charges were ultimately dismissed, and Kindle was released.

Rafael Madrigal 
Rafael Madrigal was exonerated in 2009 after spending nine years in prison for an attempted murder he did not commit. Homicide investigators focused on Madrigal after the victim and a friend of the victim identified him as the shooter from Sheriff's Department photo lineups. With the help of the California Innocence Project, Madrigal was able to bring forth evidence that his defense counsel failed to present at an evidentiary hearing, including witness testimony that Madrigal was more than 50 miles from the crime scene when the shooting occurred, and a recording of Madrigal's co-defendant admitting that Madrigal was not involved. The conviction was overturned by a federal judge citing Madrigal's attorney for failing to present this crucial evidence.

Reggie Cole 
Reggie Cole was exonerated in 2009 after spending 16 years in prison for a murder he did not commit. With the help of attorney Christopher Plourd and the California Innocence Project, the case against Cole fell apart. CIP filed a petition for writ of habeas corpus on behalf of Cole alleging that Cole's trial attorney failed to investigate and present exculpatory evidence; the prosecution withheld material, exculpatory evidence; false evidence was introduced against Cole at his trial; and the prosecutor engaged in misconduct. On April 8, 2009, Deputy District Attorney Hyman Sisman conceded on Cole's habeas petition that Cole received ineffective assistance of counsel and on April 15, 2009, Judge Jerry E. Johnson of the Los Angeles Superior Court vacated the murder conviction.

William Richards 
William Richards was exonerated in 2009 but remains behind bars. Richards, who is serving a life sentence, was convicted using a bite mark found on the hand of the victim. Originally, a forensic dentist testified that the mark matched Richards' teeth. The California Innocence Project hired new experts to re-evaluate the evidence ten years later. With enhanced technology, the clearer picture ruled out Richards as the source of the mark. In 2009 San Bernardino County Judge Brian McCarville reversed Richards' 1997 conviction. The District Attorney appealed to the Court of Appeal, which reversed Richards' reversal. In 2012 the California Supreme Court refused to overturn the conviction. In the 4–3 decision, the majority stated that Richards failed to prove that the bite mark testimony was false because "experts still could not definitively rule out [his] teeth as a possible source of the mark." Richards remains incarcerated.

Uriah Courtney 
Uriah Courtney was exonerated in 2013 when the San Diego County District Attorney's office formally dismissed charges of kidnapping and sexual assault. In 2004, Courtney was sentenced to life in prison for the crimes. In 2010 the California Innocence Project reviewed Courtney's case and eventually convinced the San Diego County District Attorney's Office to retest DNA evidence from the case using more advanced technology. The results eliminated Courtney and linked to another man to the crime. After eight years of incarceration, Courtney was released.

Jason Puracal 
Jason Puracal was exonerated in 2012 after an appeals court overturned his 22-year sentence in a Nicaragua maximum-security prison. Despite lack of evidence, Puracal was arrested November 2010 in San Juan del Sur and convicted of money-laundering, drug charges, and organized crime in August 2011. The California Innocence Project helped bring Puracal's case before a three-judge appellate panel in August 2012. On September 12, 2012, he was acquitted of all charges and ordered released.

Case screening 
CIP screens approximately 2,000 claims of wrongful conviction annually. Applicants must be incarcerated and must have at least four years remaining on their sentence. In such cases, new, strong evidence of innocence must exist. CIP only accepts cases where the conviction occurred in the following Southern California counties:
 Imperial County
 Kern County
 Los Angeles County
 Orange County
 Riverside County
 San Bernardino County 
 San Diego County
 San Luis County
 Santa Barbara County 
 Ventura County

CIP is a law school clinical program. Cases are screened by 12 students. CIP will review a case post-conviction and post-sentencing. CIP will not provide legal assistance during the time of pre-trial or trial.

Innocence March 
On April 27, 2013, CIP staff and supporters began the Innocence March, a 712-mile, two-month-long walk from the California Western School of Law in San Diego to Sacramento, where they presented Governor of California Jerry Brown with clemency petitions for 'The California 12.' In each of these inmates' cases, attorneys had exhausted all legal recourse despite compelling evidence of innocence.

The California 12 
 Ed Contreras
 Alan Gimenez
 Michael Hanline
 Suzanne Johnson
 Kimberly Long
 Dolores Macias
 Rodney Patrick McNeal
 Guy Miles
 Quintin Morris
 Kiera Newsome
 Joann Parks
 William Richards

Some of these clients had been found innocent by a judge, yet remained incarcerated for a while, although as of 2020 only one remains in prison. The Innocence March ended June 20, 2013, at the steps of the California State Capitol building in Sacramento. Following a rally attended by more than 100 supporters, attorneys from the California Innocence Project met with a staff delegation from the office of Governor Jerry Brown to plead for clemency for The California 12, and to call attention to wrongful convictions and contributing causes, such as flawed eyewitness identification and faulty science.

In 2020, the incumbent Governor of California Gavin Newsom granted clemency to dozens of prisoners, including four from the California 12, so only one - Edward Contreras, remains incarcerated.

See also
 List of wrongful convictions in the United States
 List of exonerated death row inmates
 List of United States death row inmates

References

External links
 

Non-profit organizations based in California
Legal organizations based in the United States
Criminal defense organizations
Organizations established in 1999
1999 establishments in California
Innocence Project